Pietro Micca was the first torpedo cruiser built by the Italian Regia Marina, and one of the first vessels of the type to built by any navy. She was laid down in February 1875, launched in August 1876, and completed in July 1877. Details of her armament are contradictory, with various sources reporting a range of torpedo weapons, including a single  torpedo tube, a pair of tubes of undetermined diameter, and as many as six tubes. She remained in the Regia Marinas inventory until 1893, but spent most of her 16-year life in the reserve.

Design
Admiral Simone Antonio Saint-Bon, then the Italian Minister of the Navy, ordered a small, fast vessel that was armed with Whitehead torpedoes. Saint-Bon's request came in part due to budgetary problems that prevented building a large fleet of ironclad battleships. Engineering Inspector Felice Mattei prepared the design for the new ship, which became Pietro Micca, one of the first torpedo cruisers, along with the German . Mattei and the design staff intended to build a fast, light ship that could quickly strike at an enemy ironclad and then escape before the enemy's guns could be brought to bear. Design work was completed in 1873 and Saint-Bon presented the concept to the Chamber of Deputies on 6 December that year.

General characteristics and machinery
The ship had an iron-built hull with a flat bottom; above the waterline, she had a pronounced tumblehome shape with sharply curving sides. Much of the ship's internal space was reserved for propulsion system and coal storage, with only the forward quarter reserved for crew spaces and stores. Steering was controlled with a single rudder. The ship had a very minimalist superstructure, with a small conning tower and a single pole mast. She had a crew of 73 officers and men.

Her propulsion system consisted of one single-expansion steam engine that drove a single screw propeller. The engine was produced by Gio. Ansaldo & C. Steam was supplied by four coal-fired boilers, which were separated into two boiler rooms, and each room was ducted into its own funnel.

Armament and armor

The primary weapon for Pietro Micca was her torpedo armament, but details of it are contradictory. According to Conway's All The World's Fighting Ships, she was fitted with a single  torpedo tube. The tube was mounted in the bow, above the waterline, and was supplied with ten Whitehead torpedoes. But the US Navy officer Ridgely Hunt, writing in 1891, describes the vessel as having been equipped with a pair of tubes submerged in her hull. Meanwhile, the Italian Navy describes the vessel as having had six torpedo tubes. The contemporary naval expert Edward Very seems to support the Navy's description, writing in 1881 that the ship was "provided with tubes for discharging Whitehead torpedoes ahead, abeam, and astern." She also carried a pair of machine guns, though again, the Italian Navy disagrees, stating that Pietro Micca had only one light gun.

It was placed 10 inches below the waterline.

Service history
Pietro Micca was built by the Venetian Arsenal. Her keel was laid down on 15 February 1875, and her completed hull was launched on 1 August 1876. Fitting-out work was finished on 3 July 1877. Shortly after completing sea trials, during which the crew discovered that her hull shape prevented her from reaching her intended speed, Pietro Micca was placed in reserve. Since her low speed prevented her from catching the ironclad battleships she had been intended to destroy, she did not see much service with the Italian fleet. Instead, she was used primarily as a test ship to further develop the use of torpedoes by the fleet. By 1886, Pietro Micca had been disarmed of her torpedo weapons and carried just a pair of machine guns. By that time, she was credited by The Naval Annual with a top speed of only .

According to Conway's All the World's Fighting Ships, the Italian Navy had informally removed Pietro Micca from the naval register "some years before" formally striking her in 1893. Pietro Micca was sold for scrap on 7 November that year and subsequently broken up.

Notes

References
 
 
 
 
 
 
 
 
 
 
 
 

Cruisers of the Regia Marina
1875 ships
Ships built by Venetian Arsenal